Haji (Aji) is a Malayic language spoken on the island of Sumatra in Indonesia. A third of the vocabulary is derived from Lampung.

References

Further reading 
 

Languages of Indonesia
Malayic languages